The Serpentine River is a minor river on the north western flanks of the Richmond Range in the South Island of New Zealand.

It passes through a plantation forest near the town of Richmond before emptying into Tasman Bay / Te Tai-o-Aorere.

Rivers of the Tasman District
Rivers of the Nelson Region
Rivers of New Zealand
Tasman Bay